Grayvoronsky Uyezd (Гра́йворонский уе́зд) was one of the subdivisions of the Kursk Governorate of the Russian Empire. It was situated in the southern part of the governorate. Its administrative centre was Grayvoron.

Demographics
At the time of the Russian Empire Census of 1897, Grayvoronsky Uyezd had a population of 177 479. Of these, 58.9% spoke Ukrainian, 40.9% Russian and 0.1% Polish as their native language.

References

 
Uezds of Kursk Governorate
Kursk Governorate